Korf Bay is a bay on the Kamchatka Peninsula coast of the Bering Sea in Russia.

Geography

On the west side, the Ilpinsky Peninsula separates it from Anapka Bay which forms the north end of Karaginsky Gulf. On the east, the Govena Peninsula (Cape Govensky) separates it from the Olyutor Gulf. The northern coast contains the Skrytaya Harbor, which is a major salmon fishing ground. 

The largest settlements on the gulf are Tilichiki and Olyutorovka.

History
The bay is named after Baron Andrey Korf, the first Governor General of Priamurye. This is the Baron Koff or Barankoff Bay mentioned by the American travelers Washington Vanderlip and Olaf Swenson.

The 2006 Kamchatka earthquakes were centered on the seaside village of Korf. Coal was mined and exported from a mine near the bay in the early 20th century.

Bays of the Bering Sea
Bays of Russia
Bays of Kamchatka Krai
Bodies of water of the Kamchatka Peninsula
Pacific Coast of Russia